Wilfried Edgar Barth (26 January 1917 in Herold – 20 May 1965 in Ludwigsburg) was a German (East German until 1957, then West German) Formula One and sports car racing driver.

Racing career
Barth was born in Herold.  He began his career as a DKW motorcycle racer and later switched to BMW sportscars. The East German factory of BMW would become the Eisenacher Motorenwerk (EMW) after the war.  He drove the factory team car in the East German Formula 2 Championship, which he won in both 1952 and 1953. He was allowed to participate in three events in the West in 1953, including his first appearance in the Formula One World Championship. He finished fifth in the non-championship Eifelrennen, but retired from the Avusrennen and the German Grand Prix.

In 1957, he emigrated to the West and drove sporadically for the works Porsche team in Formula One until 1961. He drove in the F2 sections at his home race in 1956 and 1957, finishing outside the points both times. He drove a Formula 1 car in the 1960 Italian Grand Prix, finishing seventh. He was entered into his home race in 1961 but was later withdrawn and was entered as a substitute at Monza that year. His final F1 appearance came at the 1964 German Grand Prix driving a Cooper-Climax for Rob Walker Racing, failing to make the flag.

Barth participated in the 500 kilometers of the Nürburgring, in 1960 in a BMW 700, finishing fifth. Barth won the 1959, 1963 and 1964 European Mountain Championships (Hillclimb) for Porsche and also the 1959 Targa Florio. Apart from Formula 2 races with Porsche 718, he also took part in the 24 Hours of Le Mans on numerous occasions.

He began to suffer from cancer at the end of 1964, and succumbed to the disease in May 1965. His son Jürgen Barth became an engineer at Porsche and also went into motorsport, winning the Le Mans 24 Hours in 1977.

Career results

Complete Formula One World Championship results
(key)

References

External links

1917 births
1965 deaths
24 Hours of Le Mans drivers
German Formula One drivers
EMW Formula One drivers
Porsche Formula One drivers
Rob Walker Racing Team Formula One drivers
German racing drivers
People from Thum
Racing drivers from Saxony
German motorcycle racers
World Sportscar Championship drivers
East German Formula One drivers

12 Hours of Reims drivers